Microparasellidae is a family of crustaceans belonging to the order Isopoda.

Genera:
 Angeliera Chappuis & Delamare-Deboutteville, 1952
 Microparasellus Karaman, 1933

References

Isopoda